"Love Bites" is a song by English glam metal band Def Leppard from their album Hysteria. The power ballad is Def Leppard's only number-one single and 4th and last top 10 hit on the US Billboard Hot 100 and became a top-10 hit in Canada, Ireland, and New Zealand. On the UK Singles Chart, the track peaked at number 11.

Song history and composition
When Robert John "Mutt" Lange originally brought the song to the band's attention, it was a country ballad, which the band thought sounded like nothing they had done before. The band then added power rock elements and emotive backing vocals similar to those used in R&B ballads at the time. The title "Love Bites" was originally used for a very different song that was eventually re-titled "I Wanna Be Your Hero", and which appeared as a Hysteria B-side and later on the album Retro Active. Musically, the song has been described as glam metal, and is considered a classic of the genre.

Following the huge momentum generated by "Pour Some Sugar on Me", the song was released in August 1988 and peaked atop the US Billboard Hot 100 for one week. The song also reached number eleven in the United Kingdom, number two in New Zealand, number three in Canada, and number seven in Ireland. The "Love Bites" 45 release in Canada and UK included limited edition gatefold with complete "Hysteria" lyrics. This was the only official release of the "Hysteria" lyrics.

Track listings
"Billy's Got a Gun" was recorded at Tilburg, Netherlands, in 1987.

7-inch: Bludgeon Riffola / Vertigo / Polygram / 830 675-1 (US)
 "Love Bites"
 "Billy's Got a Gun" (live)

12-inch and CD: Bludgeon Riffola / Vertigo / Polygram /  (US, UK)
 "Love Bites"
 "Billy's Got a Gun" (live)
 "Excitable" (Orgasmic mix)

Personnel
 Joe Elliott – lead vocals
 Phil Collen – rhythm guitar, backing vocals
 Steve Clark – lead guitar
 Rick Savage – bass, backing vocals 
 Rick Allen – drums
 Robert John "Mutt" Lange – backing vocals

Charts

Weekly charts

Year-end charts

See also
List of glam metal albums and songs
List of Hot 100 number-one singles of 1988 (U.S.)
Hysteria (Def Leppard album)

References

External links
 Song lyrics

1987 songs
1988 singles
1980s ballads
Billboard Hot 100 number-one singles
Cashbox number-one singles
Def Leppard songs
Mercury Records singles
Glam metal ballads
Song recordings produced by Robert John "Mutt" Lange
Songs written by Joe Elliott
Songs written by Phil Collen
Songs written by Rick Savage
Songs written by Robert John "Mutt" Lange
Songs written by Steve Clark
Rock ballads